Diderik or Didrik is a Norwegian male given name. In North Germanic languages, the native form would be Tjodrik, but Diderik and Didrik have been loaned from Low German and are now a common name in Norway. It may also be a variant of the related Dutch name Diederik. People with the name include:

Diderik Batens (born 1944), Belgian logician and epistemologist at the University of Ghent
Diderik Bøgvad (1792–1857), Norwegian politician
Diderik von Cappelen (1761–1828), Norwegian merchant and politician
Diderik Hegermann Rye (1832–1914), Norwegian civil servant
Diderik Hegermann (1763–1835), Norwegian councillor of state and Minister of the Army
Diderik Schnitler (born 1946), Norwegian businessperson
Diderik Iversen Tønseth (1818–1893), Norwegian politician for the Liberal Party
Diderik Wagenaar (born 1946), Dutch composer and musical theorist
Didrik Pining (c. 1430 – 1491), German privateer, nobleman and governor of Iceland

Norwegian masculine given names